Etroplus is a small genus of cichlids native to southern India and Sri Lanka. Together with Pseudetroplus (which formerly was included in Etroplus), they are the only cichlids of this region.

Their closest living relatives are Paretroplus from Madagascar. These two lineages must have separated during the Mesozoic already, as Madagascar and the Indian Plate had separated by the end of the Cretaceous.

Species
There are currently two recognized species in this genus. The third species, the orange chromide, was moved to Pseudetroplus in 2014. but FishBase still places it in Etroplus:

 Etroplus canarensis (F. Day, 1877) (Canara pearlspot)
 Etroplus maculatus  (Bloch, 1795) (Orange chromide)
 Etroplus suratensis (Bloch, 1790) (Green chromide)

References

 
Etroplinae
Cichlid fish of Asia
Freshwater fish genera
Cichlid genera
Taxa named by Georges Cuvier